The Zermatt–Sunnegga Funicular, also known as the Standseilbahn Zermatt–Sunnegga, or short SunneggaExpress, is an underground funicular railway in the canton of Valais, Switzerland. It links a lower station in the resort village of Zermatt, with an upper station at 2293 m Sunnegga, 698 m above, and forms the first link in the route to the Sunnegga Paradise ski area.
The funicular was heavily modernized by Doppelmayr in 2013.

The line has the following properties:

The funicular is operated by Zermatt Bergbahnen AG since 2002, after it absorded Standseilbahn Zermatt-Sunnegga AG that built it.

See also 
 List of funicular railways
 List of funiculars in Switzerland

References 

fr:Funiculaire du Sunnegga

Funicular railways in Switzerland
Metre gauge railways in Switzerland
Railway lines opened in 1980
Zermatt
Underground railways